John William Holman (born 1951 Durham, North Carolina) is an American short story writer, novelist, and academic.

Life
He graduated from the University of North Carolina in 1973, from North Carolina Central University with an MA in 1977, and from the University of Southern Mississippi with a PhD in 1983.
He teaches at Georgia State University.

His work appeared in The New Yorker, Crescent Review, and Mississippi Review, Appalachee Quarterly, Carolina Quarterly, Oxford American, and Alabama Literary Review,

Awards
 1991 Whiting Award

Works

Books
 
 "Squabble," Reprinted from The New Yorker, 28 December 1987
 "On Earth," Reprinted from The New Yorker, 5 December 1988
 "Monroe's Wedding," Reprinted from The New Yorker, 6 February 1989

Anthologies

Stories
 "Scuff," Alabama Literary Quarterly 6.1 (Fall/Winter 1992): 41–48.
 "Immaterial," Forum 27.2 (Fall/Winter 1993): 22–27
 "Credentials," Fictionaut (originally published in  Mississippi Review)

References

External links
 Profile at The Whiting Foundation

American short story writers
University of North Carolina at Chapel Hill alumni
North Carolina Central University alumni
University of Southern Mississippi alumni
Georgia State University faculty
Writers from North Carolina
1951 births
Living people